Thioalkalivibrio denitrificancs is an obligately alkaliphilic and obligately chemolithoautotrophic sulfur-oxidizing bacteria. It was first isolated from soda lakes in northern Russia.

References

Further reading
Robb, Frank, et al., eds. Thermophiles: biology and technology at high temperatures. CRC Press, 2007.

Shivaji, Sisinthy, et al. "Vertical distribution of bacteria in a lake sediment from Antarctica by culture-independent and culture-dependent approaches."Research in microbiology 162.2 (2011): 191–203.

External links
LPSN

Chromatiales